Scott Derrickson (born July 16, 1966) is an American filmmaker. He is best known for directing the films The Exorcism of Emily Rose (2005), The Day the Earth Stood Still (2008), Sinister (2012), Deliver Us from Evil (2014), Doctor Strange (2016) and The Black Phone (2021).

Early life 
Derrickson grew up in Denver, Colorado. He graduated from Biola University with a B.A. in Humanities with an emphasis in philosophy and literature and a B.A. in communications with an emphasis in film and theology. He completed his graduate studies at USC School of Cinema-Television.

Career 
Derrickson co-wrote and directed The Exorcism of Emily Rose, which was loosely based on a true story about Anneliese Michel. The film won the 2005 Saturn Award for Best Horror or Thriller Film and in 2006 was named in the Chicago Film Critics Association's list of the "Top 100 Scariest Films Ever Made." Theatrical box office gross for The Exorcism of Emily Rose was over $144 million worldwide. That same year, Derrickson wrote Land of Plenty for director Wim Wenders, an independent drama starring Michelle Williams.

Derrickson next directed a remake of The Day the Earth Stood Still, starring Keanu Reeves and Jennifer Connelly, written by David Scarpa. The film was released in late 2008 and earned over $233 million worldwide.

In August 2011, Derrickson teamed up with producer Jason Blum to write and direct Sinister, a mystery-horror film starring Ethan Hawke. The $3 million picture was released in theaters by Summit Entertainment on October 12, 2012, and received generally positive critical reviews. Sinister earned over $48 million at the U.S. box office and over $78 million worldwide. Derrickson co-wrote but did not direct the second film of Sinister series.

Deliver Us from Evil is a 2014 American supernatural horror film directed by Derrickson and produced by Jerry Bruckheimer. The film is officially based on a 2001 non-fiction book entitled Beware the Night by former police Sergeant Ralph Sarchie and Lisa Collier Cool, and its marketing campaign highlighted that it was "inspired by actual accounts". The film was released on July 2, 2014, and grossed $87.9 million against a $30 million budget.

Derrickson next directed the film Doctor Strange, based on the Marvel Comics property and part of the Marvel Cinematic Universe. It was released in November 2016. The film was a commercial and critical success.

In December 2018, it was announced that Derrickson would direct the Doctor Strange sequel entitled Doctor Strange in the Multiverse of Madness which was planned for a May 2021 release. In January 2020, Derrickson announced that he had stepped away from directing duties as a result of unspecified creative differences, after which Sam Raimi took over. Derrickson remained involved with the film as an executive producer.

In March 2020, it was announced that Derrickson had been hired to write and direct Skydance Media's Bermuda Triangle action-adventure, Bermuda, starring Chris Evans.

In May 2020, Derrickson was announced as the director of a sequel to Jim Henson's 1986 film Labyrinth. Maggie Levin will join him in writing the script for the movie. More recently, it was announced that Derrickson signed a first look deal with Blumhouse Television.

In 2021, Derrickson directed the adaptation of Joe Hill's short story The Black Phone, from a script by  Derrickson and C. Robert Cargill. Produced by Blumhouse and Universal Pictures, The Black Phone re-teamed Derrickson with Ethan Hawke and James Ransone, and was theatrically released to positive reviews on June 24, 2022.

In March 2022, Derrickson was set to direct The Gorge for Skydance. Apple TV+ acquried the right of the film.

Filmography

Short films

Feature films

Uncredited rewrites
 Dracula 2000 (2000)
 The Messengers (2007)
 Scream 4 (2011)
 Poltergeist (2015)

Executive producer only
 Misunderstood (2014)
 Kristy (2014)
 Snowpiercer (2020–present)
 Doctor Strange in the Multiverse of Madness (2022)

Co-producer
 The Visitation (2006)

References

External links 

Scott Derrickson on Twitter
Scott Derrickson on Instagram
Scott Derrickson on Facebook

Living people
English-language film directors
USC School of Cinematic Arts alumni
Writers from Denver
Biola University alumni
American film directors
American male screenwriters
American film producers
Horror film directors
1966 births
Screenwriters from Colorado